The 2019 European Darts Open was the first of thirteen PDC European Tour events on the 2019 PDC Pro Tour. The tournament took place at Ostermann-Arena, Leverkusen, Germany, from 22–24 March 2019. It featured a field of 48 players and £140,000 in prize money, with £25,000 going to the winner.

Michael van Gerwen was the defending champion after defeating Peter Wright 8–7 in the final of the 2018 tournament, and he defended his title by defeating Rob Cross 8–6 in the final.

In his semi-final win over Mensur Suljović, Van Gerwen became the first player to hit two nine-darters on the European Tour, taking out 147 via T19-Bull-D20, which was also the first time a filmed nine-dart finish included a bullseye, but not as the final dart (as all the previous three were double in/double out nine-darters in the World Grand Prix).

Prize money
This is how the prize money is divided:

 Seeded players who lose in the second round do not receive this prize money on any Orders of Merit.

Qualification and format
The top 16 entrants from the PDC ProTour Order of Merit on 12 February will automatically qualify for the event and will be seeded in the second round.

The remaining 32 places will go to players from six qualifying events – 18 from the UK Tour Card Holder Qualifier (held on 22 February), six from the European Tour Card Holder Qualifier (held on 22 February), two from the West & South European Associate Member Qualifier (held on 21 March), four from the Host Nation Qualifier (held on 21 March), one from the Nordic & Baltic Qualifier (held on 5 October 2018) and one from the East European Associate Member Qualifier (held on 19 January).

From 2019, the Host Nation, Nordic & Baltic and East European Qualifiers will only be available to non-Tour Card holders. Any Tour Card holders from the applicable regions will have to play the main European Qualifier. The only exceptions being that the Nordic & Baltic qualifiers for the first 3 European Tour events took place in late 2018, before the new ruling was announced, hence why Madars Razma qualified by this method, as under the new rules, he would have had to enter the European Tour Card Holder Qualifier, after regaining his Tour Card at European Q-School in January 2019.

The following players will take part in the tournament:

Top 16
  Michael van Gerwen (champion)
  Ian White (second round)
  Peter Wright (semi-finals)
  James Wade (quarter-finals)
  Mensur Suljović (semi-finals)
  Adrian Lewis (second round)
  Rob Cross (runner-up)
  Michael Smith (second round)
  Gerwyn Price (quarter-finals)
  Jonny Clayton (third round)
  Daryl Gurney (quarter-finals)
  Joe Cullen (third round)
  Dave Chisnall (third round)
  Simon Whitlock (second round)
  Darren Webster (third round)
  Jermaine Wattimena (third round)

UK Qualifier
  Mervyn King (second round)
  Justin Pipe (quarter-finals)
  Scott Taylor (second round)
  Ricky Williams (first round)
  Adam Hunt (second round)
  Steve Beaton (second round)
  William Borland (first round)
  Ross Smith (third round)
  Glen Durrant (second round)
  Ritchie Edhouse (first round)
  Josh Payne (first round)
  Jason Wilson (first round)
  Ted Evetts (second round)
  Wayne Jones (first round)
  Matthew Dennant (second round)
  Ryan Meikle (first round)
  Matthew Edgar (first round)
  Martin Atkins (Leeds) (first round)

European Qualifier
  Kim Huybrechts (second round)
  Jeffrey de Zwaan (second round)
  Krzysztof Ratajski (third round)
  Dimitri Van den Bergh (third round)
  Raymond van Barneveld (first round)
  Vincent van der Voort (second round)

West/South European Qualifier
  Wesley Plaisier (second round)
  Danny van Trijp (first round)

Host Nation Qualifier
  Fabian Herz (first round)
  Michael Rosenauer (first round)
  Nico Kurz (first round)
  Jyhan Artut (first round)

Nordic & Baltic Qualifier
  Madars Razma (first round)

East European Qualifier
  Pavel Jirkal (second round)

Draw

References 

2019 PDC Pro Tour
2019 PDC European Tour
2019 in German sport
Leverkusen
March 2019 sports events in Germany